Edmund Fanning (July 16, 1769 – April 23, 1841) was an American explorer and sea captain, known as the "Pathfinder of the Pacific."

Life
Born in Stonington in the British Crown Colony of Connecticut to Gilbert and Huldah Fanning, from nearby Groton he went to sea as a cabin boy at the age of 14, and by the age of 24 was captain of a West Indian brig in which he visited the South Pacific for the first time.

A successful trader, Fanning made a fortune in the China trade, killing seals in the South Pacific and exchanging their skins in China for silks, spices, and tea; which he in turn sold in New York City.  As master of the Betsey in 1797–1798, he discovered three South Pacific Islands — Fanning, Washington, and Palmyra — which are collectively known as the Fanning Islands. (Fanning Island, today known as Tabuaeran, is today part of Kiribati, while Palmyra, claimed by the Hawaiian Government in 1862 and owned for many years by a Hawaiian family, was purchased in 2000 by the Nature Conservancy for an ongoing study of global warming and its effect on coral reefs.)

When he discovered Palmyra Atoll, Fanning was sleeping and the ship was in command of the first mate. Fanning awoke three times in the night, and he took this as a premonition, ordering the first mate to heave to. In the morning, the ship resumed its travel and reached the reef of Palmyra in less than a mile. Had the ship continued its course at night, the entire crew might have perished.

Acting for American investors, Fanning was agent for more than 70 commercial expeditions and voyages. His partnership Fanning & Coles built the ship Tonquin in 1807, sailed her around the world several times and sold her for $37,000 to John Jacob Astor's Pacific Fur Company. Later the Tonquin was burned by Indians in the northwest.  In 1829 he was instrumental in sending out the first American naval exploring expedition, and was greatly responsible for Congress's authorizing of the Wilkes Expedition. Fanning's memoirs, Voyages Around the World, were published in 1833.  He died in New York City.

Honours
Cape Fanning in Antarctica and Fanning Ridge on South Georgia Island are named after Edmund Fanning.

References

Further reading
Cheesman, Evelyn. Sealskins for Silk, Abelard-Schuman, 1956.
 Walter, Teller. Five Sea Captains, 1960.
 Fanning, E., Voyages around the world, Collins & Hannay, New York, 1833, (reprinted 1970, The Gregg Press, New Jersey).

1769 births
1841 deaths
American explorers
American explorers of the Pacific
People from Stonington, Connecticut
American memoirists
Sealers
American fur traders